Thagattur is a Panchayat village in Vedaranyam Taluk, Nagapattinam District, Tamil Nadu, India.

Educational institutions
 Government Higher Secondary School (GHSS)

Villages in Nagapattinam district